Three Days of the Condor is a 1975 American political thriller film directed by Sydney Pollack and starring Robert Redford, Faye Dunaway, Cliff Robertson, and Max von Sydow. The screenplay by Lorenzo Semple Jr. and David Rayfiel was based on the 1974 novel Six Days of the Condor by James Grady.

Set mainly in New York City and Washington, D.C., the film is about a bookish CIA researcher who comes back from lunch one day to discover his co-workers murdered, and tries to outwit those responsible. The film was nominated for the Academy Award for Best Film Editing. Semple and Rayfiel received an Edgar Award from the Mystery Writers of America for Best Motion Picture Screenplay.

Plot 

Joe Turner is a bookish CIA analyst, code named "Condor". He works at the American Literary Historical Society in New York City, which is actually a clandestine CIA office. The seven staff members examine books, newspapers, and magazines from around the world and compare them to actual operations or to find ideas. Turner files a report to CIA headquarters on a thriller novel with strange plot elements; despite poor sales it has been translated into many languages.

Turner leaves through a back door to get staff lunches. Armed men enter the office and murder the other six staffers. Turner returns to find his coworkers dead; frightened, he grabs a gun and exits the building.

He contacts the CIA's New York headquarters in the World Trade Center from a phone booth and is given instructions to meet Wicks, his head of department, who will bring him to safety. Turner insists that Wicks bring somebody familiar, since "Condor" has never met his departmental head. Wicks brings Sam Barber, a college friend of Turner who is also a non-field CIA employee. The rendezvous is a trap and Wicks attempts to kill Turner, who wounds his superior before escaping. Wicks kills Barber to eliminate a witness and, taken into hospital, blames Turner for both shootings. Later, an intruder eliminates Wicks by turning off his life support system.

Turner encounters a woman, Kathy Hale, and forces her to take him to her apartment. He holds Hale hostage while he attempts to figure out what is happening. Hale slowly comes to trust Turner, and they become lovers.

However, Joubert, a European who led the massacre of Turner's co-workers, discovers Turner's hiding place. He visits Sam Barber's building and spends some tense moments in the elevator with Turner once the other passengers have left. After Turner leaves the building Joubert tries to shoot him but Turner manages to blend into a small crowd. The next morning a hitman disguised as a mailman arrives at Hale's apartment, but Turner manages to kill him.

No longer trusting anyone within "the Company", Turner plays a cat-and-mouse game with Higgins, the deputy director of the CIA's New York division. With Hale's help, Turner abducts Higgins, who identifies Joubert as a freelance assassin who has undertaken assignments for the CIA. Back at his office, Higgins discovers that the "mailman" who attacked Turner worked with Joubert on a previous operation. Their CIA case officer was Wicks.

Meanwhile, Turner discovers Joubert's location by utilizing his U.S. Army Signal Corps training to trace a phone call. Turner also learns the name and address of Leonard Atwood, CIA Deputy Director of Operations for the Middle East. Turner confronts Atwood at the latter's Washington D.C.-area mansion, interrogates him at gunpoint, and learns that Turner's original report filed to CIA headquarters had provided links to a rogue operation to seize Middle Eastern oil fields. Fearful of its disclosure, Atwood privately ordered Turner's section be eliminated.

As Atwood confirms this, Joubert enters and unexpectedly kills the CIA deputy director. Atwood's superiors had hired Joubert to stage the suicide of someone who was about to become an embarrassment, overriding Atwood's original contract for Joubert to kill Turner. Joubert suggests that the resourceful Turner leave the country and even become an assassin himself. Turner rejects the suggestion but heeds Joubert's warning that the CIA will try to eliminate him as another embarrassment, possibly entrapping him through a trusted acquaintance.

Back in New York, Turner has a rendezvous with Higgins near Times Square. Higgins describes the oilfield plan as a contingency "game" that was planned within the CIA without approval from above. He defends the project, suggesting that when oil shortages cause a major economic crisis, Americans will demand that their comfortable lives be restored by any means necessary. Turner points to The New York Times building and says he has "told them a story." Higgins is dismayed, asking Turner, "What have you done?" He then tells Turner that he is about to become a very lonely man, and he questions whether Turner's whistleblowing will really be published. "They'll print it," Turner defiantly replies. However, as "Condor" turns away, Higgins calls out "How do you know?"

Cast

Production 
The film was shot on location in New York City (including the World Trade Center, 55 East 77th Street, Brooklyn Heights, The Ansonia, and Central Park), New Jersey (including Hoboken Terminal), and Washington, D.C. (including the National Mall).

Soundtrack 

All music by Dave Grusin, except where noted.

 "Condor! (Theme from 3 Days of the Condor)" 3:35
 "Yellow Panic" 2:15
 "Flight of the Condor" 2:25
 "We'll Bring You Home" 2:24
 "Out to Lunch" 2:00
 "Goodbye for Kathy (Love Theme from 3 Days of the Condor)" 2:16
 "I've Got You Where I Want You" 3:12 (Grusin/Bahler; sung by Jim Gilstrap)
 "Flashback to Terror" 2:24
 "Sing Along with the C.I.A." 1:34
 "Spies of a Feather, Flocking Together (Love Theme from 3 Days of the Condor)" 1:55
 "Silver Bells" 2:37 (Livingstone / Evans; Vocal: Marti McCall)
 "Medley: a) Condor! (Theme) / b) I've Got You Where I Want You" 1:57

Release 
The film was released in September 1975; earning $8,925,000 in theatrical showings in North America.

Reception 
Rotten Tomatoes, a review aggregator, reports that 88% of 48 surveyed critics gave the film a positive review, and the average rating was 7.3/10; the site's consensus is: "This post-Watergate thriller captures the paranoid tenor of the times, thanks to Sydney Pollack's taut direction and excellent performances from Robert Redford and Faye Dunaway."

When first released, the film was reviewed positively by New York Times critic Vincent Canby, who wrote that the film "is no match for stories in your local newspaper", but it benefits from good acting and directing. Variety called it a B movie that was given a big budget despite its lack of substance. Roger Ebert wrote, "Three Days of the Condor is a well-made thriller, tense and involving, and the scary thing, in these months after Watergate, is that it's all too believable."

John Simon wrote how the book, Six Days of the Condor, had been rewritten for the film:
That the action has been relocated from sleepy Washington to furious New York City, almost all names have been changed, that the plot has been vastly over-complicated, is of lesser interest than a straight genre film, has been overloaded into an elegy of private, political, and finally, cosmic pessimism, a kind of national, if not metaphysical, guilt film to enchant the disenchanted.
In closing his review, Simon said the lesson he derived from the film was, "we must be grateful to the CIA: it does what our schools no longer do—engage some people to read books."

French philosopher Jean Baudrillard lists the film as an example of a new genre of "retro cinema" in his essay on history in the now influential book, Simulacra and Simulation (1981):

Some critics described the film as a piece of political propaganda, as it was released soon after the "Family Jewels" scandal came to light in December 1974, which exposed a variety of CIA 'dirty tricks'. However, in an interview with Jump Cut, Pollack explained that the film was written solely to be a spy thriller and that production on the film was nearly over by the time the Family Jewels revelations were made, so even if they had wanted to take advantage of them, it was far too late in the filmmaking process to do so. He said that despite both Pollack and Redford being well-known political liberals, they were only interested in making the film because an espionage thriller was a genre neither of them had previously explored.

Awards and nominations 
 Wins
 Cartagena Film Festival: Golden India Catalina, Best Actor, Max von Sydow; 1976.
 David di Donatello Awards: Special David, Sydney Pollack, for the direction; 1976.
 Edgar Allan Poe Awards: Edgar; Best Motion Picture, Lorenzo Semple Jr. David Rayfiel; 1976.
 Kansas City Film Critics Circle Awards: KCFCC Award; Best Supporting Actor, Max von Sydow; 1976.
 Motion Picture Sound Editors: Golden Reel Award; Best Sound Editing - Sound Effects; 1976.

 Nominations
 Academy Awards: Oscar; Film Editing, Fredric Steinkamp and Don Guidice; 1976.
 Cartagena Film Festival: Golden India Catalina; Best Film, Sydney Pollack; 1976.
 Golden Globe Awards: Golden Globe; Best Motion Picture Actress - Drama, Faye Dunaway; 1976.
 Grammy Awards: Grammy; Best Album of Original Score Written for a Motion Picture or Television Special, Dave Grusin; 1977.
 AFI's 100 Years...100 Thrills; 2001

Legal action 
In 1997, The Association of Danish Film Directors (Danske Filminstruktører), on behalf of the director Sydney Pollack, sued Danmarks Radio on the grounds that cropping the film for television compromised the artistic integrity of the original film and that broadcasting the film in a reduced screen version violated Pollack's copyright. However, the case was unsuccessful because the film rights to Three Days of the Condor were not actually owned by Pollack. The case is believed to have been the first legal challenge to the practice of panning and scanning widescreen films for terrestrial broadcast.

Cultural legacy
 Joubert's musings in the penultimate scene (see under Plot above) on how Turner might be killed by the CIA are reprised almost word-for-word in the Seinfeld episode "The Junk Mail." The speech is used as a warning from Newman to Kramer about how the U.S. Postal Service will retaliate for Kramer's refusal to receive his mail.
 In Out of Sight, Jack Foley (George Clooney) and Karen Sisco (Jennifer Lopez) discuss the film's romantic subplot, which Sisco describes as dubious.
 The Marvel Comics superhero film Captain America: The Winter Soldier (2014) was inspired by this film and other sources as well as by the original comic book source material. The directors, the Russo brothers, admit this and say that Robert Redford's casting in their film was intended as an homage.
 Perhaps the most famous line in the film is Turner's challenge to Higgins, “You think not getting caught in a lie is the same thing as telling the truth?” Director Sydney Pollack has admitted to using variations of that line in three of his other films: Tootsie (1982), The Firm (1993), and The Interpreter (2005).
 The famous hacker Kevin Mitnick chose the Condor nickname after watching the movie.
 R&B Singer Amerie sampled the movie's main theme "Condor!" for her 2002 hit "Why Don't We Fall in Love".

TV series 

In March 2015, Skydance Media in partnership with MGM Television and Paramount Television announced that they would produce a TV series remake of the film. In February 2017, Max Irons was cast as Joe Turner in the series entitled Condor for Audience.

This eventually became a series developed by Todd Katzberg, Jason Smilovic, and Ken Robinson. The series premiered on June 6, 2018 on Audience. In July 2018, the series had been renewed for a second season. 
However, in January 2020, Audience announced it would be ending operations in its current format, effectively cancelling the show. The second season, already filmed at the time of the announcement, premiered on June 9, 2020, on C More and RTÉ2.

See also 
 List of American films of 1975
 Conspiracy thriller
 Techno-thriller
 United States Joint Publications Research Service—a U.S. government organization which the "American Literary Historical Society" was said to have been modeled.

References

External links 

 
 
 
 
 
 

1975 films
1970s spy films
1970s political thriller films
American spy thriller films
Edgar Award-winning works
Films about conspiracy theories
Films scored by Dave Grusin
Films directed by Sydney Pollack
Films set in New York City
Films set in Washington, D.C.
Films based on American novels
Films based on thriller novels
Films shot in Virginia
Paramount Pictures films
American political thriller films
American spy films
Cold War spy films
Films about the Central Intelligence Agency
Films with screenplays by Lorenzo Semple Jr.
Films produced by Dino De Laurentiis
Techno-thriller films
Films shot in New York City
Films shot in Washington, D.C.
Films shot in New Jersey
1970s English-language films
1970s American films